Catasauqua Residential Historic District is a national historic district located at Catasauqua, Lehigh County, Pennsylvania.  The district includes 63 contributing buildings in Catasauqua.  It consists mainly of large mid- to late-19th century dwellings in a variety of architectural styles including Colonial Revival, Queen Anne, and Neo-Classical Revival styles. Notable residences are the Dery Mansion, David Thomas House, Fatzinger House, and Oscar Stein House.

It was added to the National Register of Historic Places in 1984.

References

Queen Anne architecture in Pennsylvania
Colonial Revival architecture in Pennsylvania
Historic districts in Lehigh County, Pennsylvania
Historic districts on the National Register of Historic Places in Pennsylvania
National Register of Historic Places in Lehigh County, Pennsylvania